is the fifteenth single by Japanese recording artist Aya Ueto. It was released on May 30, 2007.

Overview 
"Namida no Niji" was included on the standard edition of Ueto's fifth studio album Happy Magic: Smile Project. It served as theme song for the TV Asahi drama Hotelier, starring Ueto herself. The song, which she co-wrote with singer-songwriter Izumi Sakaki, marks Ueto's first foray into songwriting.

In a press release, Ueto commented, "The song was composed by a Korean producer. We couldn't quite find the right Japanese lyrics to go with the music, so I decided that perhaps I should write the words myself." About the title of the song, she commented, "When it's raining, people's faces are hidden by their umbrellas. Without an umbrella, you get to experience a world that no one else at that moment can."

Ueto explained in an interview with Oricon Style her reasons for not writing her own lyrics before "Namida no Niji":
I had always said I would never write the lyrics to my songs because it would feel like people were peeping into my heart, but after deciding on the theme for the song and once I started writing, I realized it wasn't so bad after all. I worked with Izumi Sakaki on this song, she took my lyrics and polished them. I'm happy it turned out so well.

The second A-side, "Save Me," was written, composed, and produced by Tourbillon keyboardist Hiroaki Hayama. It was used in the TBS sports program J Spo. Despite being an A-side, "Save Me" was not included in Ueto's succeeding studio album Happy Magic: Smile Project.

Chart performance 
"Namida no Niji/Save Me" debuted on the Oricon Daily Singles chart at number 12 on May 29, 2007 and climbed to number 11 the following day. It peaked at number 17 on the Oricon Weekly Singles chart, with 8,904 copies sold in its first week. The single charted for five weeks and has sold a total of 14,858 copies.

Track listing

Charts

Release history

References

External links 

2007 singles
Aya Ueto songs
Japanese television drama theme songs